The Service and Reform List (also Service and Reformation List) is an electoral coalition formed to contest the Iraqi Kurdistan legislative election of 2009 by the Kurdistan Islamic Union, the Islamic Group in Kurdistan, the Kurdistan Socialist Party and the Future Party.

References

Electoral lists for Iraqi elections
Kurdish political party alliances
Political party alliances in Iraq
Political parties in Kurdistan Region
Kurdish nationalist political parties
Kurdish political parties in Iraq